Gorno Selo may refer to:
 Gorno Selo, Sofia Province, Bulgaria
 Gorno Selo, Dolneni, North Macedonia